Publius Cornelius Scipio (died 211 BC) was a general and statesman of the Roman Republic and the father of Scipio Africanus.

A member of the Cornelia gens, Scipio served as consul in 218 BC, the first year of the Second Punic War. He sailed with his army from Pisa with the intention of confronting Hannibal in Hispania. Stopping at Massalia (today Marseille) to replenish his supplies, he was shocked to discover that Hannibal's army had moved from Hispania and was crossing the Rhône. Scipio disembarked his army and marched to confront Hannibal, who, by now, had moved on. Returning to the fleet, he entrusted the command of his army to his brother Gnaeus Cornelius Scipio Calvus and sent him off to Hispania to carry on with the originally intended mission. Scipio returned to Italy to take command of the troops fighting in Cisalpine Gaul.

On his return to Italy, he advanced at once to meet Hannibal. In a sharp cavalry engagement near the Ticinus, a tributary of the Po river, he was defeated and severely wounded. In December of the same year, he again witnessed the complete defeat of the Roman army at the Trebia, when his fellow consul Tiberius Sempronius Longus allegedly insisted on fighting against his advice.

Despite the military defeats, he still retained the confidence of the Roman people; his term of command was extended and the following year found him in Hispania with his brother Calvus, winning victories over the Carthaginians and strengthening Rome's position in the Iberian peninsula. He continued the Iberian campaigns until 211, when he was killed during the defeat of his army at the upper Baetis river by the Carthaginians and their Iberian allies under Indibilis and Mandonius. That same year, Calvus and his army were destroyed at Ilorci near Carthago Nova. The details of these campaigns are not completely known, but it seems that the ultimate defeat and death of the two Scipiones was due to the desertion of the Celtiberians, who were bribed by Hasdrubal Barca, Hannibal's brother.

At his funeral, a certain Lucius Marcius was giving a speech when suddenly, his head spontaneously caught on fire. This has been interpreted as a divine message to Scipio's soldiers for them to avenge his death.

The son of Lucius Cornelius Scipio, he was the father of Publius Cornelius Scipio Africanus (the elder), and of Lucius Cornelius Scipio Asiaticus.

Notes

References

See also
Scipio-Paullus-Gracchus family tree

211 BC deaths
3rd-century BC Roman consuls
Characters in Book VI of the Aeneid
Cornelii Scipiones
Roman commanders of the Second Punic War
Roman generals killed in action
Roman governors of Hispania
Year of birth unknown
Roman patricians